Dawson McCartney (born October 15, 1998) is an American soccer player who currently plays as a midfielder for Portland Timbers 2. Dawson played for the Dartmouth Big Green through the 2020 season.

Early life
Dawson was born in Voorhees, NJ where he spent the majority of his childhood. His parents, Edward and Annemarie,  played collegiate soccer and field hockey, respectively. 

Dawson has three siblings, Edward, Troy and Cole. Edward played soccer for The College of New Jersey, graduated from the University of North Carolina School of Law and is an attorney at Milbank LLP. Troy played soccer at the University of Delaware, graduated from the University of Pennsylvania School of Dental Medicine and is a dentist in his orthodontic residency at the University of Nevada Las Vegas.

Club career
McCartney joined Bethlehem Steel on an academy level contract for the 2017 USL season. He made his debut in a 1–0 home loss to Charleston Battery, and retained his place in the team for the following game against the Harrisburg City Islanders.

He committed to playing college soccer at Dartmouth College in 2017. In 2017, he was named  Ivy League Rookie of the Year and Top Drawer Soccer Freshman Best XI First Team. In 2018 and 2019, he was named Second Team All-Ivy.

He was selected by the Portland Timbers in the second round of the 2021 MLS SuperDraft.

In December 2020, McCartney transferred to the University of Notre Dame.

References

External links
 
 
 Profile at US Soccer
 Notre Dame bio

1998 births
Living people
Association football midfielders
American soccer players
Philadelphia Union II players
People from Voorhees Township, New Jersey
Soccer players from New Jersey
USL Championship players
Sportspeople from Camden County, New Jersey
Portland Timbers draft picks
Dartmouth Big Green men's soccer players
Reading United A.C. players
USL League Two players
Notre Dame Fighting Irish men's soccer players
GPS Portland Phoenix players
Portland Timbers 2 players
MLS Next Pro players